The 184th Warsaw Infantry Regiment was an infantry regiment of the Imperial Russian Army. The regiment was formed on March 27, 1811, in the reign of Alexander I of Russia. The distinctive "Warsaw" received during Congress Poland. The festival was celebrated on March 27. In 1914 the unit was stationed in Shuya, Ivanovo Oblast, located 300 miles northeast of Moscow. In the 46 infantry division (xxv army corps). soldier regiment was, inter alia, Pavel Argeyev, późnieszy as hunting of World War I, and from 1907 - 1909 Konstantin Kalinin known aircraft.

Bibliography
 
 Spis pułków armii carskiej (pl)
 http://www.grwar.ru/regiments/regiments.html?form_type_id=7&id=500 (ru)
 http://mosgrenadier.narod.ru/dip/inf157208.htm (ru)

Infantry regiments of the Russian Empire